Aineh (also Romanized as Ā’īneh; also known as Āina and Ā’īneh Vand) is a village in Beshiva Pataq Rural District, in the Central District of Sarpol-e Zahab County, Kermanshah Province, Iran. At the 2006 census, its population was 674, in 147 families.

References 

Populated places in Sarpol-e Zahab County